Sunkhani may refer to:

Sunkhani, Baglung, Nepal
Sunkhani, Sindhulpalchok, Nepal
Sunkhani, Nuwakot, Nepal